John Milton Dabney (November 1867 – November 1967) was an American Negro league outfielder in the 1880s.

A native of Richmond, Virginia, Dabney played for the Cuban Giants in 1886. In his only recorded game, he went hitless in four plate appearances. Dabney died in Newark, New Jersey in 1967 at age 99 or 100.

References

External links
 and Seamheads

1867 births
1967 deaths
Date of birth missing
Date of death missing
Cuban Giants players
Baseball outfielders
Baseball players from Richmond, Virginia
20th-century African-American people